"Make It Clap" is the first single released from Busta Rhymes's sixth studio album, It Ain't Safe No More..., released on the following month, which is November 26, 2002. The remix version was released on January 13, 2003 as the official single in place of the original, released two months earlier, which is October 22, 2002. It features Sean Paul and Spliff Star. The single peaked at #46 on the Billboard Hot 100.

Music video
The music video takes place in a club. Other settings in the video include Busta Rhymes and Sean Paul in different outfits. Other scenes others have both them and Spliff Starr together in black jackets. The video also shows some dancehall dancers and strippers.

Charts

Weekly charts

Year-end charts

Release history

References

 

2002 singles
2002 songs
2003 singles
Busta Rhymes songs
J Records singles
Reggae fusion songs
Sean Paul songs
Songs written by Busta Rhymes
Songs written by Rick Rock